Llanos de Apacunca Genetic Reserve is a nature reserve in Nicaragua. It is one of the 78 reserves which are under official protection in the country, as a part of the Estero Real Natural Reserve.

References

Protected areas of Nicaragua